École secondaire Marie-Anne is a francophone public secondary mixed school located in the Ahuntsic-Cartierville borough in Montreal. Part of the Centre de services scolaire de Montréal (CSSDM), it was originally in the catholic School board Commission des écoles catholiques de Montréal (CECM) before the 1998 reorganization of School boards from religious communities into linguistic communities in Quebec.  In 2019, the school has 756 students.

The school
The establishment is modern, has four stories with lots of windows and sits on a green land with trees. It contains mainly regular classrooms, rooms for computer labs, science labs, a cafeteria, a student café, a library, a weight room, a playroom and an auditorium. The school also comprises a small gymnasium and, outside, 3 basketball courts.

A transition school of 27 classrooms will be constructed in 2023 on the school land to host temporarily a total of 464 students.

Programs and services
The school offers two programs for students from grade 9 to grade 11 for drop-outs students from 16 to 21 years old: a general education program or an applied general education program.

Professional services are offered to the students: specialized educators, psychoeducator, education specialist, resources teachers, nurse, guidance counsellor, etc.

Activities
Basketball
Cosom hockey
Environment club
Graduation ceremony
Kickboxing
Movies
Ping-pong
Soccer
Student radio
Weight training
Welcome Days

References

External links
 École secondaire Marie-Anne at the CSDM
 École secondaire Marie-Anne (old website)

High schools in Montreal